Hostel is a TV series about six teenagers who live in a hostel in Kathmandu to pursue higher studies. It portrays students from different walks of lives who live together and share a strong bond of emotional relationships. The show aired in the summer of 2003 for 18 episodes in Nepal Television but was abruptly taken off-air.

Plot 
It was produced by an independent production house called Shree Maruni Film Production and was directed by young director Nitesh Raj Pant who directed another popular show with similar theme titled "Catmandu". Catmandu was an incredibly successful TV series and director Pant tried a similar plot in Hostel.

Hostel began with the introduction to the resident students. A new guy from Biratnagar joins them in the first episode who is scared off by the rest of the friends. Then the show went and explored other aspects of students living away from home and having fun together. The show also depicted the personal life of the owner of the place played by Shrijana Acharya. Director Nitesh Raj Pant also joined the show in the role of a character called Abhay in the final few episodes. Veteran actor Santosh Pant made a cameo in the final episode.

Cast of Hostel 
 Shrijana Acharya .. Ma'am
 Nitesh Raj Pant .. Abhay
 Loonibha Tuladhar ..
 Pallav ..
 Bhuvan KC .. Ksitiz
 Priyanka Sharma .. Bijeta
 Abhilasha Subba .. Sonia
Sattu

Crew of Hostel 
 Director : Nitesh Raj Pant
 Camera: Kanak Mishra
 Script/Screen Play Writer: "Surendra Rana"and Safar Pokharel

There were rumours about the show returning to the TV in 2006 with a new cast but the plans were shattered when director Nitesh Raj Pant himself moved away to Sydney, Australia.

See also
 The Hostel - Ugandan drama series

Related links
 Nitesh Raj Pant Profile
 Nitesh Raj Pant at DCNepal.com

Nepalese television sitcoms
2003 Nepalese television series debuts
2000s Nepalese television series
2003 Nepalese television series endings